Sir Roger Manwood's School is a selective grammar school located in the medieval town of Sandwich, Kent, England. Founded in 1563, it is one of the oldest schools in Britain and the third oldest state grammar school in Kent. Originally an all-boys school, the school became coeducational in 1982 and welcomed boarders until 2020. It now operates as a day school.

History
The school was founded in 1563 by Sir Roger Manwood, an eminent barrister, jurist and supporter of the reformation of the Church in England. Manwoods intention was to create a free grammar school to make education more accessible to the local townspeople. The original location of the school was at Ash Road in Sandwich but it was moved to its current location at Manwood Road in 1895. There are four foundations which appoint governors: Lord Warden of the Cinque Ports, Lincoln College, Oxford, Gonville and Caius College, Cambridge and the Diocese of Canterbury.

In 1960 there were 100 boarders. The boarders were separated into two houses; ‘The Grange’ accommodating the girls and ‘The Lodge’ the boys. After a long-running tradition of being an all-boys school, girls were first admitted in 1982. As of September 2020, the school no longer ran their boarding facilities.

The school was reported as being 'Good' in all categories by Ofsted in 2022, dropping from the previous report's 'outstanding'.

Admissions
In order to gain entry the prospective student must first pass the 11+ examination.

Once enrolled, new pupils are assigned a house, which will also be their form group from Years 7 to 9. From Years 10 to 13 pupils from each house are mixed into new forms. Each house is identified by a different colour. The houses and colours are as follows: Atlas House is red, Carmarthen House is orange, Founders' House is green, Stour House is light blue and Ypres House is dark blue.

The houses were previously Tudor (light blue), Trappes (dark blue), Knolles (dark green) and Dorman (red).

Headteachers
 Edward Henry Blakeney, M.A. (Cantab.), (1895–1901)
 Rev. Harold Buchanan Ryley, M.A. (Oxon.), (1901–1905)
 Rev. George Edward Battle, M.A. (Dublin), (1905–1914)
 Rev. William Burton, M.A. (Cantab.), (1914–1935)
 Ephraim Parker Oakes, M.A. (Cantab.),  (1935–1960)
 John Frederick Spalding, M.Sci. (London), J.P., (1960–1978)
 Howell Griffiths (1978–1990)
 Ian Mellor (1991–96), then Stockport Grammar School from 1996 to 2005
 Christopher Morgan (1996–2013)
 Lee Hunter (September 2013 – present)

Sport
Facilities include a full size sports hall, a gym, a half sized hockey astroturf. Sports offered include gymnastics, badminton, football, basketball, trampolining and table tennis, in addition to the main sports of rugby, hockey, netball, rounders, cricket and athletics. The astroturf was opened by Mel Clewlow, an England women's hockey captain and Old Manwoodian.

Combined Cadet Force
The school has a Combined Cadet Force (CCF) group with an army section. Annual CCF events include an inspection day, a summer camp, and a Founder's Day parade celebrating both the founding of the school and paying homage to Sir Roger Manwood.

Notable former pupils
The Old Manwoodians Association is an alumni association for ex-pupils of the school. Old Manwoodians include:

Arts and entertainment

Johnny Beerling, controller of Radio 1 1985–93 who launched the Radio 1 roadshow and was responsible for broadcasting Live Aid
Jon Driscoll, an Olivier Award-winning and Tony-nominated theatre projection designer
Patrick Miles, an English writer and translator
Christopher Newton, theatre director
Gale Pedrick, Scriptwriter, author and broadcaster
Jack Scanlon, child actor and title character in The Boy in the Striped Pyjamas
Frances Tophill, a horticulturalist and TV presenter, working on Gardeners World amongst other programmes 

Richard Webster, a British author
Nick Wilton, actor and scriptwriter who has appeared in shows including Eastenders
Marcus Sedgwick, a British writer and illustrator

Academia
Dr Ken Riley, Physicist, Senior Tutor at Clare College, Cambridge and Emeritus Lecturer in Physics at Cambridge University.
Professor John Hartley, Director of the Centre for Culture and Technology at Curtin University in Western Australia and Professor of Journalism, Media and Cultural Studies at Cardiff University.
Richard Ovenden, Bodley's Librarian at the Bodleian Library

Medicine
Professor Donald Longmore OBE, who was one of the team that performed the UK's first heart transplant

Engineering
Hayne Constant, a mechanical and aeronautical engineer who developed jet engines during WWII
Zoe Laughlin, a British artist, materials engineer and Director of the Institute of Making at University College London

Journalism
Jonathan Beale, BBC Defence Correspondent since 2017

Sport
Tammy Beaumont, England international cricketer and world number 1 female batter in 2021 
Melanie Clewlow, England international hockey player
Eugene Gilkes, Commonwealth athelete representing England at 1986 an 1990 games. Bronze medal winner in 1990.
Keith Stock, pole-vaulter who competed at the 1984 Olympics

Clergy
Rt Rev John Kingsmill Cavell, Bishop of Southampton from 1972 to 1984

Politics
William Brown, Labour MP from 1929 to 1931 for Wolverhampton West and from 1942 to 1950 for Rugby
Sir Robin Knowles CBE, High Court judge

References

External links
 Sir Roger Manwood's School website

Further reading
 John Cavell & Brian Kennett (1963). A History of Sir Roger Manwoods School Sandwich 1563–1963.  Cory, Adams & Mackay.

Sandwich, Kent
Grammar schools in Kent
Educational institutions established in the 1560s
Boarding schools in Kent
1563 establishments in England
Academies in Kent
State funded boarding schools in England